Rhytisma punctatum is a species of fungus in the family Rhytismataceae. The fungus causes speckled tar spot of maple leaves. The small spots are black, raised from the leaf surface, and occur in dense groups on the upper surface. Areas afflicted by the fungus will retain their color even after the remainder of the leaf has faded.

References

External links

Fungi described in 1800
Fungal plant pathogens and diseases
Leotiomycetes
Taxa named by Christiaan Hendrik Persoon